In Greek mythology, Corax (Ancient Greek: Κόραξ Korax or Κόρακος means 'raven') or Corex was the 16th king of Sicyon who reigned for 30 years.

Family 
Corax was the elder son and heir of King Coronus, descendant of the city's founder Aegialeus. He was brother of Lamedon.

Mythology 
In some versions of the myth, Corax received the throne from his predecessor Echyreus, in whose reign Danaus became the king of Argos.

After Corax died childless, Lamedon was his rightful successor, but Lamedon was usurped by Epopeus who came from Thessaly and seized the kingdom from him. In the latter's reign, the conflict between Sicyon and Thebes ensued.

Notes

References 

 Pausanias, Description of Greece with an English Translation by W.H.S. Jones, Litt.D., and H.A. Ormerod, M.A., in 4 Volumes. Cambridge, MA, Harvard University Press; London, William Heinemann Ltd. 1918. . Online version at the Perseus Digital Library
 Pausanias, Graeciae Descriptio. 3 vols. Leipzig, Teubner. 1903. Greek text available at the Perseus Digital Library.

Princes in Greek mythology
Mythological kings of Sicyon
Kings in Greek mythology
Sicyonian characters in Greek mythology